Phyllomacromia congolica is a species of dragonfly in the family Corduliidae. It has lime green/yellow and black stripes. It is found in the Democratic Republic of the Congo, Malawi, Zambia, Zimbabwe, and possibly Guinea.

References

Corduliidae
Taxonomy articles created by Polbot